No. 576 Squadron RAF was a Royal Air Force Second World War heavy bomber squadron.

History
576 Squadron was formed on 25 November 1943 at RAF Elsham Wolds in Lincolnshire under the command of Wing Commander G.T.B Clayton DFC. "A" Flight was formed under Squadron Leader Dilworth and composed of 4 experienced aircrews drawn from 101 Squadron, with the remainder drawn from the Group 1 Heavy Conversion Units. "B" Flight was formed under Squadron Leader Attwater and consisted of 13 experienced aircrew and 9 aircraft from "C" Flight of 103 squadron. 

576 Squadron commenced operations in the night of 2/3 December 1943, when seven Avro Lancasters were sent out to bomb Berlin.  FSGT John Booth RAAF and crew in UL-R2 (W4123) failed to return from this operation. Eleven months later 576 Squadron moved to RAF Fiskerton, a little way outside Lincoln. During its brief period of existence 576 Squadron operated only one type of aircraft, the Avro Lancaster four-engined heavy bomber. It carried out 2,788 operation sorties with the Lancaster, with the loss of 66 aircraft. The last bombs of the squadron were dropped on 25 April 1945, when 23 of the squadrons aircraft bombed Obersalzberg with no loss of personnel. During this period, 576 Squadron flew 2,788 operational sorties; 67 aircraft were lost, including two abandoned over France in February 1945. The Jamaican airman Billy Strachan flew 15 operations as a pilot with the squadron. 

576 then took part in Operation Manna - the dropping of food supplies to the Dutch; Operation Exodus - repatriation of British ex-POWs to Great Britain; Operation Post Mortem - testing the efficiency of captured German early-warning radar; and Operation Dodge-the transport of British troops to Great Britain from Italy. 576 Squadron's last operation was part of Operation Manna in which 28 aircraft were detailed to drop food to the starving Dutch people in Rotterdam on 7 May 1945. 

576 Squadron was disbanded at Fiskerton on 13 September 1945.

Aircraft operated

Notable aircraft
Four of the Lancasters that flew with 576 squadron managed to survive one hundred operations or more:

Squadron bases

References

Notes

Bibliography

External links

 576 squadron history on old MOD site
 Squadron histories for nos. 541–598 sqn on RafWeb's Air of Authority – A History of RAF Organisation
 576 Squadron RAF website

Bomber squadrons of the Royal Air Force in World War II
576 Squadron
Military units and formations established in 1943